The Tindi are an indigenous people of Dagestan, North Caucasus living in five villages in the center area around the Andi-Koisu river and the surrounding mountains in the northwestern part of southern Dagestan. They have their own language, Tindi, and primarily follow Sunni Islam, which reached the Tindi people around the 8th or 9th century. The only time that the Tindis were counted as a distinct ethnic group in the Russian Census was in 1926, when 3,812 reported to be ethnic Tindis. In 1967, there were about 5,000 ethnic Tindis (T. Gudava). They are culturally similar to the Avars. 

The basis of the Tindis' ethnic identity is their language, but its use is limited to domestic settings and is decreasing. Therefore, the Tindis are in danger of assimilation by the Avars, whose language is the dominant local one.

Neighboring peoples are the Chamalals, Avars, Bagvalals, Akhvakhs, Khwarshis.

References
The peoples of the Red Book: Tindis

Ethnic groups in Dagestan
Muslim communities of Russia
Peoples of the Caucasus
Muslim communities of the Caucasus